Jernej Godec (born January 16, 1986 in Ljubljana) is a freestyle and butterfly swimmer from Slovenia, who competed for his native country at the 2004 Summer Olympics in Athens, Greece and the 2008 Summer Olympics in Beijing, China.

Member of the Ilirija Swimming Club from Ljubljana, Slovenia; his former coaches include Aleš Cerkovnik and Borut Klinec but in 2004 moved to the USA as a student-athlete majoring in Molecular and Cell Biology and competing for the University of California, Berkeley. After training with coach Mike Bottom for several years he continued under the current Cal Golden Bears swimming team head coach Dave Durden. He moved to Boston, MA to continue pursuing a doctoral degree in Immunology at Harvard University, which he completed in 2016. Jernej now lives in New York City, NY.

Godec currently holds the Slovenian national records in 50 m freestyle (22.19) and 50 m butterfly (23.20) in long course (50 m) swimming pools as well as 50 meter butterfly (22.47), 50 meter freestyle (21.18), and 50 meter backstroke (23.53) in short course (25 m) pools and still holds numerous national records in different age group categories. With these times, he is currently ranked as 15th in 50m butterfly (long course meters pool) and 9th in 50m butterfly, 17th in 50m freestyle, 21st in 50m backstroke (short course meters pool) on the FINA all-time world rankings. He is married to a dermatologist in Winchester.

Achievements
 2003:
 European Junior Championships — 3rd, 100 m freestyle; 5th, 200 m freestyle
 World Aquatics Championships — 10th, 4×100 m medley relay
 2004: Olympic Games, Athens — 14th, 4×100 m medley relay
 2005:
 World Aquatics Championships — 19th, 50 m butterfly; 25th, 50 m freestyle; 12th, 4×100 m freestyle relay; final, 4×100 m medley relay (dq)
 Mediterranean Games — 3rd, 50 m freestyle
 2006: European LC Championships — 9th, 50 m butterfly; 11th, 50 m freestyle; 14th, 100 m butterfly
 2007: World Aquatics Championships — 14th, 50 m freestyle; 14th, 50 m butterfly
 2008:
 Olympic Games, Beijing — 18th, 50 m freestyle
 World Short Course Swimming Championships — 7th, 50 m freestyle; 12th, 50 m butterfly
 2009:
 World Aquatics Championships — 12th, 50 m butterfly
 World University Games — 1st, 50 m butterfly
 CISM World Military Championships — 1st, 50 m butterfly (CISM Record); 1st, 50 m freestyle; 2nd, 100 m freestyle
 European Short Course Swimming Championships — 4th, 50 m butterfly; 10th, 50 m freestyle; 10th, 4x50m medley relay: 12th 50m backstroke

See also
 California Golden Bears

References

Cal Bears: Jernej Godec Bio
Slovenian Swimming Federation
CISM Results
FINA World Rankings

1986 births
Living people
Olympic swimmers of Slovenia
Slovenian male freestyle swimmers
Male butterfly swimmers
Swimmers at the 2004 Summer Olympics
Swimmers at the 2008 Summer Olympics
University of California, Berkeley alumni
Sportspeople from Ljubljana
Slovenian male swimmers
Mediterranean Games bronze medalists for Slovenia
Swimmers at the 2005 Mediterranean Games
Universiade medalists in swimming
Mediterranean Games medalists in swimming
Universiade gold medalists for Slovenia
Harvard Medical School alumni
Medalists at the 2009 Summer Universiade